All Star Family Feud was an Australian game show which aired on Network Ten from 14 March 2016 until 6 May 2018. The series, which is a spin off of Family Feud, sees celebrities compete in teams to raise money for their chosen charity. All Star Family Feud was filmed at Global Television Studios in Southbank, Melbourne from 2016–2017 and at Network Ten's Studios in Pyrmont, Sydney in 2018.

Differences from regular Family Feud
The primary difference in game play of the All Star version compared to the civilian version is the number of rounds (as a 60-minute show compared to 30 minutes) and win conditions.  Each game consists of six rounds (3 regular value rounds, 2 "double" rounds, and a "triple" round), with the winner being the team with more points at the end of the sixth round (there is no 300 points to win rule, and no Sudden Death).  The first two members of each team face off twice, and the other two members face off once (with the exception of the 2017 The Bold and the Beautiful 30th Anniversary episode, where the Atlanta format of five players per team was used, where only the captain plays twice and the other four members play once).

The winning team wins an automatic $20,000 for their chosen charity and has a chance at Fast Money for a bonus $10,000. The losing team is automatically guaranteed $10,000 for their nominated charity.

As with Family Feud, losing Fast Money donated $10 a point.

Season overview

Episodes

Season 1 (2016)
Note: Winners are listed in bold

Season 2 (2017)
Note: Winners are listed in bold

Season 3 (2018)
Note: Winners are listed in bold

References

Network 10 original programming
2010s Australian game shows
2016 Australian television series debuts
2018 Australian television series endings
English-language television shows
Television shows set in Melbourne
Family Feud
Australian television series based on American television series